Hebrew religion may refer to:
 Canaanite religion
 Judaism

See also
 Ancient Semitic religion
 Origins of Judaism
 Religions of the ancient Near East